Sergei Anatolyevich Karev (born 31 March 1986) is a Russian retired pair skater. With former partner Arina Ushakova, he is the 2005 Golden Spin of Zagreb silver medalist and 2007 Winter Universiade bronze medalist. They placed 5th at the 2008 European Championships.

Career 
Early in his pairs career, Karev competed with Daria Kaziutchitz. They placed 9th at the 2005 Russian Championships and 5th at the Russian Junior Championships.

In 2005, Karev teamed up with Arina Ushakova, with whom he trained in Moscow. Originally coached by Nina Mozer, the pair switched to Natalia Pavlova ahead of the 2007–08 season. Ushakova/Karev won the bronze medal at the 2008 Russian Nationals and were sent to the 2008 European Championships where they finished 5th. In the long program, they had a fall on a lift but were not injured. They split at the end of the season.

Programs 
(with Ushakova)

Results 
JGP: Junior Grand Prix

With Ushakova

With Kaziutchitz

References

External links 
 
 Tracings.net profile

Russian male pair skaters
Living people
1986 births
Figure skaters at the 2007 Winter Universiade
Medalists at the 2007 Winter Universiade
Universiade medalists in figure skating
Sportspeople from Lipetsk
Universiade bronze medalists for Russia